General (Gen) is a military rank used by the Canadian Army and Royal Canadian Air Force typically held by the officer who is serving as the chief of the Defence Staff – the senior uniformed officer of the Canadian Forces – if they belong to those elements. Admiral is the equivalent rank in the Royal Canadian Navy.

The rank insignia for a general in the Royal Canadian Air Force is a wide braid below three narrow braid on the cuff, as well as four silver maple leaves, beneath crossed sword and baton, all surmounted by St. Edward's Crown, worn on the shoulder straps of the Service Dress tunic. In the Canadian Army, the rank insignia is a wide braid on the cuff, as well as four gold maple leaves, beneath crossed sword and baton, all surmounted by St. Edward's Crown, worn on the shoulder straps of the Service Dress tunic. The rank is also worn on slip-ons on other uniforms. On the visor of the service cap are two rows of gold oak leaves.

The rank is referred to as "four-star", a reference to its American equivalent. Prior to the 1968 unification of the Canadian Forces, the equivalent rank in the Royal Canadian Air Force was air chief marshal.

See also 
 Canadian Forces ranks and insignia

References

Canadian generals
Military of Canada
Military ranks of Canada
Military insignia